This is a list of Number 1 hit singles in 1976 in New Zealand, starting with the first chart dated, 30 January 1976.

Chart

Notes

 Number of number-one singles: 11
 Longest run at number-one: "Mississippi" by Pussycat (11 weeks).
 ABBA would be the most successful artist/group/band of 1976, having four #1 songs.

See also

 1976 in music
 RIANZ

References

External links
 The Official NZ Music Chart, RIANZ website

1976 in New Zealand
1976 record charts
1976
1970s in New Zealand music